Elm Grove Township is one of sixteen townships in Calhoun County, Iowa, United States.  As of the 2000 census, its population was 213.

History
Elm Grove Township was created in 1876. It takes its name from a natural grove of elm trees.

Geography

References

External links
 City-Data.com

Townships in Calhoun County, Iowa
Townships in Iowa